The LEN Euro Cup is the second-tier European water polo club competition run by the Ligue Européenne de Natation for those clubs who did not qualify for the LEN Champions League. The cup was inaugurated in 1992.

History

Names of the competition
 1992–2011: LEN Trophy
 2011–present: LEN Euro Cup

Title holders

 1992–93:  Újpest
 1993–94:  Racing Roma
 1994–95:  Barcelona
 1995–96:  Pescara
 1996–97:  Újpest
 1997–98:  Partizan
 1998–99:  Újpest
 1999–00:  Jug
 2000–01:  Mladost
 2001–02:  Leonessa
 2002–03:  Leonessa
 2003–04:  Barcelona
 2004–05:  Savona
 2005–06:  Leonessa
 2006–07:  Sintez Kazan
 2007–08:  Shturm Chekhov
 2008–09:  Szeged
 2009–10:  Cattaro
 2010–11:  Savona
 2011–12:  Savona
 2012–13:  Radnički Kragujevac
 2013–14:  Spartak Volgograd
 2014–15:  Posillipo
 2015–16:  Brescia
 2016–17:  Ferencváros
 2017–18:  Ferencváros
 2018–19:  Marseille
 2019–20 Cancelled due to COVID-19 pandemic
 2020–21:  Szolnok
 2021–22:  Sabadell

Winners
LEN Trophy

LEN Euro Cup

Titles by club

Titles by nation

See also
 Women's LEN Trophy (female counterpart)

References

External links
Official website
Water Polo European Cups Archive

 
Euro Cup
Recurring sporting events established in 1992
Multi-national professional sports leagues